Siah Marz-e Gavabar (also Romanized as Sīāh Marz-e Gavābar) is a village in Amlash-e Jonubi Rural District, in the Central District of Amlash County, Gilan Province, Iran. At the 2006 census, its population was 81, in 24 families.

References 

Populated places in Amlash County